Shruti Sodhi is an Indian film actress who works primarily in Telugu and Punjabi films. She was born on September 22nd, 1988 in New Delhi.

Career
Shruti Sodhi studied in New Delhi, and has a degree in philosophy. Shruti worked as a news anchor in two Hindi channels. Shruti made her Telugu debut with Pataas, which released in January 2015. Shruti has also worked in four Punjabi films like Happy Go Lucky, Mr & Mrs 420, Vaisakhi List and Dil Vil Pyaar Vyaar.

Filmography

References

External links
 
 Shruti Sodhi on Instagram
 Shruti Sodhi on Twitter

Actresses from Delhi
Indian film actresses
Living people
Actresses in Telugu cinema
Actresses in Punjabi cinema
21st-century Indian actresses
1989 births